Dariapur is an area located in Ahmedabad, India. Situated in Central Ahmedabad, Daripur is famous for housing some of the important tourist destinations in Ahmedabad. Among them are Qutab Shah Mosque and Rani Sipri's Mosque. Muhafizkhan's Mosque is another Muslim sanctum situated here. Dariyapur is a ward of Dariapur (Vidhan Sabha constituency).

See also
 Dariapur (Vidhan Sabha constituency)

References

Neighbourhoods in Ahmedabad